Tavares Martin Jr. (born February 4, 1996) is an American football wide receiver for the Reyes de Jalisco of the Liga de Fútbol Americano Profesional (LFA). He also played for the Vienna Vikings in the Austrian Football League. Martin played college football at Washington State.

Early years
Martin attended John I. Leonard Community High School in Greenacres, Florida for his first three years of high school before transferring to William T. Dwyer High School for his senior year. As a senior at Dwyer, he caught 37 passes for 641 yards and six touchdowns. He committed to play football for the Washington State Cougars in May 2015.

College career
As a true freshman in 2015, Martin played in 12 of Washington State's 13 games, catching 16 passes for 124 yards and one touchdown along with returning 25 kickoffs for 552 yards.

In 2016, as a sophomore, Martin started in all 13 games, recording 64 receptions for 728 yards and seven touchdowns. He also returned seven kickoffs for 147 yards.

As a junior in 2017, Martin played in 11 of 13 games, catching 70 passes for 831 yards and nine touchdowns. He missed Washington State's game against Colorado due to suspension and the 2017 Holiday Bowl after he was cut from the team due to a "violation of team rules" according to a WSU athletic spokesperson. However, Martin stated he was cut after he asked for his release. He declared for the 2018 NFL Draft on January 13, 2018, but was not drafted and remained unsigned.

In his three seasons with the Cougars, Martin finished as one of the all time leaders in receptions (150), yards (1683), and touchdown catches (17). He also was a main kick returner for the team.

Professional career

Massachusetts Pirates
Martin signed with the Massachusetts Pirates of the National Arena League for the 2019 season.

Spokane Shock
For the 2020 season, which was cancelled or postponed due to the COVID-19 pandemic, he was on the Spokane Shock roster.

Vienna Vikings
In 2022, Martin was signed mid-season and played for the Vienna Vikings in the Austrian Football League. He had 12 catches for 204 yards and four touchdowns in four games played in the regular season. In the two playoff games, Martin had 12 receptions for 263 yards and two touchdowns. The Vikings lost in the Austrian Bowl championship game to the Danube Dragons.

Carolina Cobras
On December 10, 2022, Martin signed with the Carolina Cobras of the National Arena League (NAL).

Reyes de Jalisco
Despite reportedly joining the Carolina Cobras, Martin joined the Reyes de Jalisco of the Liga de Fútbol Americano Profesional (LFA) in December 2022. In his debut with the team, he caught three touchdown passes as the Reyes defeated the Gallos Negros de Querétaro 42–14.

References

External links
Washington State bio

1996 births
Living people
American football wide receivers
Washington State Cougars football players
Reyes de Jalisco players
American expatriate players of American football
American expatriate sportspeople in Austria
American expatriate sportspeople in Mexico
Players of American football from Florida
People from Palm Beach County, Florida